Yongtong Bridge, also known as Small Stone Bridge (小石桥),  is an old single-hole circular arch bridge. It is located outside the west gate of Zhao County on the Ye River (冶河, now the Qingshui River).

Construction times
Yongtong Bridge's construction date, due to the lack of original information, so there have been a variety of opinions. There is a view that it was built in the Mingchang period (明昌年间) of the Jin Dynasty (1190-1196).

According to the bridge stone components and inscriptions excavated from under the Yongtong Bridge in 1986, the Bridge began construction in the early years of Yongtai (永泰) in the Tang Dynasty (765).

References 

Deck arch bridges
Bridges in Hebei
Tang dynasty
Jin dynasty (1115–1234)
Arch bridges in China
Stone bridges in China
Chinese architectural history
Transport in Hebei
Buildings and structures in Hebei
8th-century establishments in China